Abu Ramad ("ashy one") is a town located in the Halaib Triangle, a 20,580 km2 (7,950 sq mi) area disputed between Egypt and the Sudan. It is currently de facto administered by Egypt.

References 

Populated places in Red Sea Governorate